The 1979–80 NBA season was the Kings 31st season in the NBA and their eighth season in Kansas City.

Due to a June 1979 storm which caused the collapse of Kemper Arena's roof, the Kings were forced to play most of their home games at Municipal Auditorium, their Kansas City home during their first two seasons in the Midwest (the Kings split their home schedule between Kansas City and Omaha during the 1972-73, 1973–74 and 1974–75 seasons before settling in Kansas City full-time). The Kings were able to return to Kemper late in the season.

Draft picks

Roster

Regular season

Season standings

z - clinched division title
y - clinched division title
x - clinched playoff spot

Record vs. opponents

Game log

Regular season

|- align="center"
|colspan="9" bgcolor="#bbcaff"|All-Star Break
|- style="background:#cfc;"
|- bgcolor="#bbffbb"

Playoffs

|- align="center" bgcolor="#ffcccc"
| 1
| April 2
| @ Phoenix
| L 93–96
| Otis Birdsong (23)
| Reggie King (10)
| Phil Ford (7)
| Arizona Veterans Memorial Coliseum12,660
| 0–1
|- align="center" bgcolor="#ccffcc"
| 2
| April 4
| Phoenix
| W 106–96
| Scott Wedman (32)
| Scott Wedman (9)
| Phil Ford (13)
| Kemper Arena9,637
| 1–1
|- align="center" bgcolor="#ffcccc"
| 3
| April 6
| @ Phoenix
| L 99–114
| Scott Wedman (24)
| Reggie King (11)
| Phil Ford (6)
| Arizona Veterans Memorial Coliseum11,306
| 1–2
|-

Player statistics

Season

Playoffs

Awards and records
 Scott Wedman, NBA All-Defensive Second Team

Transactions

References

See also
 1979-80 NBA season

Sacramento Kings seasons
K
Kansas
Kansas